Bishgan (also Romanized as Bīshgān; also known as Bashgān, Bayānī, and Beyānī) is a village in Dasht-e Zahab Rural District, in the Central District of Sarpol-e Zahab County, Kermanshah Province, Iran. At the 2006 census, its population was 38, in 7 families.

References 

Populated places in Sarpol-e Zahab County